Gigantocoreabus lumbaris is a species of beetles in the family Buprestidae, the only species in the genus Gigantocoreabus.

Correct spelling is Gigantocoraebus, not -eabus

References

Monotypic Buprestidae genera